Robert W. Lyon (May 22, 1842 – October 9, 1904) was Mayor of Pittsburgh from 1881 to 1884.

Early life
Mayor Lyon was born in Butler County, Pennsylvania north of Pittsburgh in 1842. He joined the 102nd Pennsylvania Volunteers during the American Civil War. When he came home from war Lyon made a small fortune in the petroleum industry.

Pittsburgh politics
Mayor Lyon won election in 1881 and was best known as "the working man's mayor." He guided city hall into the completion of the Smithfield Street Bridge and the successful annexation of the Garfield neighborhood. The AFL, forerunner to the AFL-CIO, was founded in Pittsburgh under his administration.

In 1884, he went to work in a steel mill and worked in county government until his death in 1904. He was buried in Calvary Cemetery in the west suburb of McKees Rocks.

See also

List of mayors of Pittsburgh

1842 births
1904 deaths
Mayors of Pittsburgh
Union Army soldiers